North Carolina Journal of Law & Technology (JOLT) is a semi-annual student publication of the University of North Carolina School of Law.  The journal, one of the first of its kind, was founded in 1998 and is viewed as one of the top law and technology journals in the country. 

JOLT takes a broad view of the term "technology."  As such, topics in many seemingly divergent areas of the law can qualify for publication in JOLT, provided there is some relationship to a field of technology.  Recently, articles have dealt with ethics, privacy, bankruptcy, First Amendment, tax law, and criminal law, as well as more traditional "technology" areas such as copyright and patent law. 

In addition to the print issues, JOLT staff writers also publish an online edition as well as a weekly blog.

External links
Official website
NCJOLT sample

American law journals
Technology law journals
University of North Carolina at Chapel Hill publications
Law journals edited by students
Publications established in 1998